Malaya Serva is a rural locality (a village) in Stepanovskoye Rural Settlement, Kudymkarsky District, Perm Krai, Russia. The population was 354 as of 2010. There are 7 streets.

Geography 
Malaya Serva is located 4 km east of Kudymkar (the district's administrative centre) by road. Plotnikova is the nearest rural locality.

References 

Rural localities in Kudymkarsky District